Gaud Saraswat Brahmins (GSB) (also Goud or Gawd) are a Hindu Brahmin community of the north. The  Konkani speaking Gaud Saraswat of Goa and southern India claim to be descendents of these Gaud Saraswat Brahmins of the north that migrated to Konkan from Gaud, as per the Skanda Purana.
Their traditional occupation was trading.

Etymology
There are many interpretations on how the Gaud Saraswat Brahmins received the name "Gaud" and the information about it is scant.

Authors Jose Patrocinio De Souza and Alfred D'Cruz interpreters that the word Gauda or Goud may have been taken from Ghaggar, with Goud and Saraswat having the same meaning, that is an individual residing on the banks of river Saraswati.

Scholars write that "Shenvi" and "Gaud Saraswat Brahmin" are synonyms.

Historically, Jana Tschurenev states that the Shenvis were a community that claimed to be Brahmins. The name GSB is a modern construction based on newly curated caste history and origin legends.

History

Sahyadrikhanda and interpretation

Deshpande writes that as per Sahyadrikhanda, "Chitpavan and Karhade brahmins are "new creations of base-origins" and not a part of "established Gaud or Dravid groups". After Parashuram created the Chitpawans from fishermen who had assembled around some funeral pyre in Konkan, their later actions displeased him. As if to rectify his mistake, Parashuram brought ten sages from North India, specifically, Trihotra (Trihut, Bihar) and set them up in Goa for performing ancestral rites, fire sacrifice and dinner offerings. The fourth chapter of Sahyadrikhanda describes the Gotras of these Brahmins and praises them as "best brahmins, honored by the kings, good-looking, with righteous behavior, and expert in all rites".

The Gauḍa Sārasvat brahmins from southern India, whose claim to Brahminhood was often not accepted by the surrounding Dravid Brahmins, could use this text from Sahyadrikhanda to address the conflict. Wagle makes no judgement on the validity of the claim of Northern origin and writes: 

However, Bambardekar believes that in fact the Pancha Dravid Brahmins are the original Gauda Brahmins and cites a verse from the Skanda Puran to prove his assertion and thus does not accept the Gauda or Brahmin claim of the Gauda Saraswats.

In addition, as per some modern scholars like Hewitt, the Sahyadrikhanda is considered corrupted by many modifications and interpolations to the original. As an example, Madhav Deshpande cites the 4th verse from chapter-I which when translated is: Deshpande considers this as a "sloppy interpolation" to get Trihotra in the list of Brahmin migrations as the Gaud Saraswats group has migrated from Trihotra in northern India as per the text. There is a reference to Kānyakubja in this verse and Kanoji in the previous although they are the same.

Occupation

After commercial activities in the Indian Ocean increased after the 1400s, Pius Malekandathil states that "many Indians, particularly the banyas, the Gowda Saraswat Brahmins began to move to different marts of this maritime space to conduct trade, where they eventually set up nucleus for Indian diasporas"

South Kanara is part of the Kanara coast from Goa to Kerala. In the sixteenth century, the increase and export of rice production here was brought about by the GSB, the Bunts and Billava coconut growers. The Gaud Saraswat Brahmin - which Marine Carrin  and Lidia Guzy describe as a "Konkani speaking community of traders [who were] already established along the coast" now became the major rice exporters. The Bunts controlled the land while the GSB controlled the rice trade in the markets. Thus in South Kanara, the GSB were merchants by occupation and not priests who served in temples. The priestly as well as clerical function was performed by Shivalli Brahmins. This remains the case even in modern times although other castes have entered the trading occupations now.

During the Portuguese rule and later, they were again one of the main trading communities. They also served as "village - Kulkarnis, financiers, tax-farmers in the intra-Asian trade, and diplomatic agents". Many sources of government income in Goa, Konkan and elsewhere, including taxes on cloth and tobacco, were controlled by them. Some engaged with Tobacco trade with Brazil in the early eighteenth century.

In the mid-19th century, in Portuguese India, the trade in Goa changed focus from luxury items to essential items only. Coconut, salt, areca-nuts, fruits and poultry were exported, whereas rice and timber were imported. According to  Borges, Pereira and Stubbe, of the trading communities, the Gaud Saraswat Brahmins and Gujarati Vania played the major role in this trade and Mormugao city became the major meeting place for the traders. British and Portuguese interests clashed during this time.

In Maharashtra, Saraswats had served as administrators under the Deccan Sultanates such as the Adil Shahi. In the 18th century during the Maratha empire era, the Shinde and the Holkar rulers of Ujjain and Indore recruited Saraswats to fill their administrative positions.

A sample study in the 1970s in Kota, Karnataka found that the Gaud Saraswat Brahmins owned most of the grocery and general merchandise stores.

Miscellaneous

In Kalhana's Rajatarangini (12th century CE), the Saraswats are mentioned as one of the five Pancha Gauda Brahmin communities residing to the north of the Vindhyas.

Reference to Saraswat names are found in Shilaharas as well as Kadamba copper plate inscriptions. The inscriptions found in Goa bear testimony to the arrival of Brahmin families in the Konkan region.

The Shilahara kings seem to have invited supposedly pure Aryan Brahmins and Kshatriyas from the Indo-Gangetic plain to settle in Konkan. These castes are the Gaud Saraswat Brahmins and Chandraseniya Kayastha Prabhus.

The GSB ancestors identified themselves as of the Saraswat section of the northern Gaud division, in contrast to their Maharashtra and Karnataka Brahman neighbours of the southern division.  Many Saraswats left Goa after the invasion of Malik Kafur to the neighbouring regions and during the period of religious persecution of the Portuguese also Saraswats migrated to Uttar Kannada, Udupi, Dakshina Kannada, Kerala and South Konkan. The French traveller François Pyrard de Laval met the GSBs, originally from the island of Goa, in Calicut, in the beginning of 17th Century. He writes: 

Historian Farias states that the Gaud Saraswats supposedly intermarried with women from other castes after their arrival in Goa.

Varna disputes
There were varna disputes related to the Shenvi subsection of the GSB. The Brahmins of Maharashtra, i.e. Deshastha, Chitpavan and Karhade were unanimous in the rejection of the Brahmin claim of the (Shenvi)Gaud Saraswat Brahmins. Bambardekar, a prominent researcher on Konkan's history, in his 20th-century Bhaṭṭojidīkṣitajñātiviveka also rejects the Brahmin claim of the Shenvi GSB as well as their "gauda-ness". He argues that the Seṇavīs adopted the term Gauḍa-Sārasvata in the latter part of the 19th century. According to Bambardekar, the (Shenvi)GSBs have falsified the Kannada word gowḍa meaning ‘village chief’ as being identical with the Sanskrit word gauḍa and challenges their Brahmin status itself. Bambardekar cites a document from 1694 AD and another from 1863 AD in which the Brahmins and Shenvis are separately listed. University of Michigan scholar Madhav M. Deshpande cites R.V.Parulekar and states that " British administrative documents from the early 19th century Maharashtra always list brahmins and Shenvis as two separate castes". Irawati Karve and G. S. Ghurye consider GSB's as part of larger Saraswat Brahmins and overall Brahmin community. The Hindu scripture Sahayadhri Khanda provided support for the Brahmanical genealogy of the GSB.

Culture

Classification and culture
Gaud Saraswat Brahmins have both Madhvas and Smarthas among them. The Gaud Saraswats following Dvaita Vedanta of Madhvacharya are followers of Kashi Math and Gokarna Math, while the followers of Advaita Vedanta of Adi Shankara are followers of Kavale Math and Chitrapur Math. Among Gaud Saraswat Brahmins the Madhvas are Vaishnavites, while the Smarthas are considered as Shivites & Shaktites. According to author A B de Bragnanca Pereira says, "The main deities worshipped by Shaivite are Mangesh, Shantadurga, and Saptakoteshwar, while the Vaishnavites deities are Nagesh, Ramnath, Mahalakshmi, Mahalasa, Lakshmi, Narasimha, Venkataramana, Kamaksha, Bhagwati and Damodar". Most of the GSB's in the Malabar Coast, Karnataka, Kerala and Tamil Nadu regions are followers of Madhvacharya. In Goa, the GSB's who follow Madhvacharya and are mainly concentrated in the Bardez and Salcete regions.

Diet
Vaishnavite GSB who follow Madhvacharya are  lacto-vegetarian. while the Smarthas include seafood as part of their diet. Historian Kranti K Farias states that "Their main food is rice - called congi or Pej. Shakta Smarthas offer and then consume mutton, fowl and liquor during the worship of  the female divine.

Notable people

Festivals

See also
 List of Saraswats
 Canara Konkani
 Saraswat cuisine
 Rajapur Saraswat Brahmins
 Chitrapur Saraswat Brahmin
 Kudaldeshkar Gaud Brahmins

References

Bibliography

Further reading

 
Hock, Hans (1999) "Through a Glass Darkly: Modern "Racial" Interpretations vs. Textual and General Prehistoric Evidence on Arya and Dasa/Dasyu in Vedic Indo-Aryan Society." in Aryan and Non-Aryan in South Asia, ed. Bronkhorst & Deshpande, Ann Arbor.

External links
Temples of Gaud Saraswat Brahmins in Mumbai
Temples of GSB's in Konkan coast
GSB Temples uniqueness
GSB Konkani Mathas and Swamiji's

Gaud Saraswat Brahmin
Brahmin communities of Goa
Brahmin communities